Granton Gasworks railway station was a private railway station built to serve the Granton Gasworks in Granton, Edinburgh, Scotland that operated from 1902 to 1942. After laying vacant for decades, the station was brought back into use in 2023 as Granton Station Creative Works, a creative enterprise hub operated by the arts charity Wasps.

History 

Granton Gasworks railway station was developed by the Caledonian Railway to carry workers to and from the Granton Gasworks, which lay a short distance to the west. A private station built for the Edinburgh and Leith Gas Commissioners, it was a terminal station linked to the Granton branch of the Caledonian Railway. Designed by Walter Ralph Herring (the chief engineer for the Granton Gasworks), construction of the station began in 1898. Services to the station commenced operation in October 1902, with the station being formally opened on 27 February 1903 by the Lady Provost of Edinburgh, Barbara Steel. In addition to its transport role, the station also served as an office for the Gasworks and housed clocking-in machines for the workers as well as toilets and lockers. Until 1923, when the Caledonian Railway was grouped into the London, Midland and Scottish Railway, Gasworks workers were able to travel to and from Edinburgh Princes Street railway station at no cost.

The station is two storeys high, built in a classical Edwardian style in red and yellow brick with ashlar sandstone dressings. The building bears decorative shields with the coat of arms of Edinburgh and Leith. The station had two platforms, one to the north and one to the south. A footbridge previously connected the station to the Gasworks to the west over the sidings. The station was granted category 'B' listed status by Historic Scotland in 1998, being described as "a good example of stately corporation architecture applied to an industrial site". Writing in 1984, Gifford, McWilliam, and Walker described the "bizarre and stately architecture [...] all red brick with yellow trim".

The station was closed in 1942 by the London, Midland and Scottish Railway as alternative transport links to the area had improved. During the Second World War, it was identified by Nazi Germany as a potential bombing target but was never attacked. The station lay largely disused for the next 81 years while much of the surrounding land was redeveloped. In 2000, Foster and Partners brought forward plans for a wider redevelopment of the Granton Gasworks that included the retention of the station.

In 2018, Granton Gasworks railway station was acquired by the City of Edinburgh Council as part of the wider Granton Waterfront regeneration. In 2020, the Council announced plans to redevelop the station into an "enterprise hub", with the adjacent former sidings to the west to be turned into a civic square. Designs for the redevelopment were prepared by ADP Architecture. Work commenced in June 2021. In August 2021, the City of Edinburgh Council announced that the enterprise hub would be operated under a lease by the arts charity Wasps. In December 2022, the new civic square won a Future Cities Forum Winter Award in the "masterplanning - regeneration and mixed use" category. The civic square formally opened on 11 March 2023, being named "Granton Station Square".

References

External links 

 Granton Gasworks railway station on the Canmore database
 Granton Gasworks railway station at the National Transport Trust website

1902 establishments in Scotland
1942 disestablishments in Scotland
Category B listed buildings in Edinburgh
Disused railway stations in Edinburgh
Edwardian architecture
Former Caledonian Railway stations
Former London, Midland and Scottish Railway stations
Former private railway stations
Gasworks
Granton, Edinburgh
Listed railway stations in Scotland
Railway stations in Great Britain closed in 1942
Railway stations in Great Britain opened in 1902